Liu Rui (born 6 January 1987) is a Chinese taekwondo practitioner. 

She won a bronze medal in heavyweight at the 2005 World Taekwondo Championships, and a silver medal at the 2009 World Taekwondo Championships in Copenhagen. She won a gold medal at the 2010 Asian Games.

References

External links

1987 births
Living people
Chinese female taekwondo practitioners
Taekwondo practitioners at the 2010 Asian Games
Asian Games medalists in taekwondo
Medalists at the 2010 Asian Games
Asian Games gold medalists for China
World Taekwondo Championships medalists
21st-century Chinese women